Pectinivalva caenodora is a moth of the family Nepticulidae. It is found along the south-eastern coast of New South Wales.

The wingspan is about 6.4 mm for males and 5.8–6.5 mm for females.

The larvae possibly feed on Eucalyptus. They probably mine the leaves of their host plant.

References

External links
Australian Nepticulidae (Lepidoptera): Redescription of the named species

Moths of Australia
Nepticulidae
Moths described in 1906
Taxa named by Edward Meyrick